Sheridan High School is a public high school in Sheridan, Oregon, United States.

History
The class of 2008 was the 100th class in the school's history.

Academics
In 2008, 91% of the school's seniors received their high school diploma. Of 66 students, 60 graduated, 1 dropped out, 3 received a modified diploma, and 2 were still in high school in 2009.

Notable alumni
 Ray Hare, American football player
 Joni Huntley, bronze medalist in the high jump at the 1984 Summer Olympics
 Barbara Roberts, former governor of Oregon

References

External links 
 Sheridan High School
 Student performance data
 2007-08 Final AYP report

Sheridan, Oregon
High schools in Yamhill County, Oregon
Public high schools in Oregon